The Battle of Tukaroi, also known as the Battle of Bajhaura or the Battle of Mughulmari, was fought between the Mughal Empire and the Bengal Sultanate on 3 March 1575 near the village of Tukaroi in present-day Balasore District of Odisha. It resulted in a Mughal victory and greatly weakened the Bengal Sultanate.

Background 
Muhammad Bakhtiyar Khalji of the Delhi Sultanate, defeated the Sena king Lakshman Sen at his capital, Nabadwip in 1203–1204 and conquered most of Bengal. The Deva family – the last Hindu dynasty to rule in Bengal – ruled briefly in East Bengal, although they were suppressed by the mid-fourteenth century.

During the early Muslim period, the former Sena Hindu kingdom became known as the Sultanate of Bangala and Bihar, ruled intermittently from the Sultanate of Delhi. The chaotic shifts in power between the Afghan and Turkish rulers of that sultanate came to an end when Mughal rule became established in Bengal during the sixteenth century.

During the reign of Mughal Emperor Jalal ud-Din Muhammad Akbar the Sultan of Bangala was Daud Khan Karrani, who had seized the Fort Zamania a frontier post of the Mughal Empire. This gave Akbar the cause for war.

Akbar who was in Gujarat when he received the news of Daud's audacity, at once dispatched orders to Munim Khan and the representative of the imperial power in Jaunpur to chastise the aggressor. Munim on receipt of his sovereign's instructions assembled a powerful force and marched on Patna where he was opposed by Lodi Khan an influential Afghan chief who had placed Daud on the throne and now served that prince as minister Munim Khan who was then very old had lost his energy and after some skirmishing was content to cease hostilities and grant Daud extremely lenient terms. Neither of the principal parties was pleased and Emperor Akbar thought that the Munim Khan had been too easy going whereas Daud was jealous of his minister Lodi Khan. The emperor accordingly deputed Raja Todar Mal to take the command in Bihar making over the Raja's civil duties as Diwan temporarily to Rai Ram Das. Daud treacherously killed his minister Lodi Khan and confiscated his property. Munim Khan stung by his master's censure returned rapidly to Patna and laid siege to the city. But he soon found the task of taking it to be beyond his powers and begged Mughal Emperor Jalal ud-Din Muhammad Akbar to come in person and assume charge of the campaign. Akbar who had just returned to the capital after paying his annual visit to Ajmer proceeded to Agra in March 1574 and prepared a fleet of elaborately equipped boats to proceed down the rivers.

On 15 June 1574, Akbar embarked for the river voyage and was accompanied by many of his best officers Hindu and Muslim.The names of nineteen given by Abu'l-Fazl ibn Mubarak include Bhagwan Das, Raja Man Singh, Raja Birbal, Shahbaz Khan and Kasim Khan, the admiral or Mir Bahr. The rainy season being then at its height the voyage was necessarily adventurous and many mishaps occurred. Several vessels foundered off Etawah and 11 off Allahabad.

After travelling for 26 days Akbar reached Benares where he halted for three days. He then proceeded and anchored near where the Gomti River joins the Ganga River. On the same day the army which had marched by land arrived. The whole movement evidently had been thought out and executed with consummate skill in the face of tremendous difficulties due to the weather. The ladies and children were sent to Jaunpur and Akbar in response to urgent entreaties from Munim Khan that he would be pleased to come in person with all speed to the front, advanced to the famous ferry at Chaunsa where his father, Emperor Humayun, had suffered a severe defeat in 1539. The army was then brought across to the southern bank of the river.

Siege of Patna 

Patna had been under siege for several months now under Munim Khan. Akbar continued his journey by water and on 3 August 1574 landed in the neighbourhood of Patna. After taking counsel with his officers and ascertaining that the besieged city relied for the greater part of its supplies on the town of Hajipur situated on the opposite or northern bank of the Ganges he decided that the capture of that place was a necessary preliminary to the successful accomplishment of the main design. The difficulties caused by the flooded state of the huge river many miles in width at that season and the strenuous resistance of a strongly posted garrison were overcome and the fort was captured by the gallantry of the detachment appointed by Akbar to the duty. The heads of the Afghan leaders killed were thrown into a boat and brought to Akbar who forwarded them to Daud as a hint of the fate which awaited and in due course befell him.

The same day Akbar ascended the Panj Pahari or Five Hills a group of extremely ancient artificial mounds standing about half a mile to the south of the city and thence reconnoitred the position. Daud, although he still had at his disposal 20,000 horses, a large park of artillery and many elephants, came to the conclusion that he could not resist the imperial power and decided on flight. During the night he slipped out quietly by a back gate and went to Bengal. The garrison which attempted to escape in the darkness suffered heavy losses in the process. Akbar was eager to start at once but was persuaded to wait until the morning when he entered Patna by the Delhi gate. He then personally pursued the fugitives for about 50 miles but failed to overtake them.

An enormous amount of booty including 265 elephants was taken and the common people enjoyed themselves picking up purses of gold and articles of armour in the streams and on the banks. The capture of so great a city in the middle of the rainy season was an almost unprecedented achievement and a painful surprise to the Bengal Sultan. He had reckoned on Akbar following the good old Indian custom of waiting until the Dasahara festival in October to begin a campaign. But Akbar disregarded adverse weather conditions and so was able to win victories in defiance of the shastras and the seasons.

Akbar returns to Fatehpur Sikri 

The question now came up for decision whether the campaign should be prosecuted notwithstanding the rains or postponed until the cold season. Opinions were divided but Akbar had no hesitation in deciding that delay could not be permitted. Accordingly, he organised an additional army of more than 20,000 men entrusting the supreme command to old Munim Khan who was appointed governor of Bengal. Raja Todar Mal and other capable officers were placed under his orders Jaunpur, Benares, Chunar and certain other territories were brought under the direct administration of the Crown and officers were appointed to govern them on behalf of Akbar. He resolved to return to his capital leaving the Bengal campaign to be conducted by his generals. Late in September while he was encamped at Khanpur in the Jaunpur district he received dispatches announcing the success of Munim Khan. The emperor arrived at Fatehpur Sikri on 18 January 1575 after seven months of strenuous travelling and campaigning.

Battle 

The Mughal army marched into the capital of Bengal, Tanda (near Gaur), and Daud withdrew to Odisha. He had gathered a host. The action was forced on Munim Khan who was compelled to engage before he was ready when the Bengalis unexpectedly went on the offensive at dawn.

In the early stages of the field battle the Mughal commander received several severe wounds and was knocked out and victory seemed assured to the Bengali army. But Akbar now commanded a flanking attack later in the day. The cavalry on both sides fought valiantly and but the attack from the Mughal cavalry decimated the Bengali cavalry, who fell back.

Eventually the untimely death of Daud's general in the melee Gujar Khan caused the tides to change sides and brought about the total defeat of Nawab Daud who fled from the field along with 30,000 of his troops.

Treaty of Katak and Aftermath 

The battle led to the Treaty of Katak in which Daud ceded the whole of Bengal and Bihar, retaining only Odisha. The treaty eventually failed after the death of Munim Khan who died at the age of 80. Sultan Daud Khan took the opportunity and invaded Bengal. This would lead to the Battle of Raj Mahal in 1576.

Notes 

Bengal Subah
Tukaroi
Tukaroi 1575
Tukaroi 1575
1575 in India
Military history of the Bengal Sultanate